The 2017 Ricoh Open was a tennis tournament played on outdoor grass courts. It was the 28th edition of the Rosmalen Grass Court Championships, and part of the 250 Series of the 2017 ATP World Tour, and of the WTA International tournaments of the 2017 WTA Tour. Both the men's and the women's events took place at the Autotron park in Rosmalen, 's-Hertogenbosch in the Netherlands, from June 12 through June 18, 2017.

ATP singles main-draw entrants

Seeds

 1 Rankings are as of May 29, 2017.

Other entrants
The following players received wildcards into the main draw:
  Tallon Griekspoor
  Stefan Kozlov
  Alexander Zverev

The following player received entry using a protected ranking:
  Thanasi Kokkinakis

The following players received entry from the qualifying draw:
  Tatsuma Ito
  Daniil Medvedev
  Dennis Novikov
  Vasek Pospisil

The following players received entry as a lucky losers:
  Julien Benneteau
  Jason Jung

Withdrawals
Before the tournament
  Chung Hyeon →replaced by  Jason Jung
  Juan Martín del Potro →replaced by  Evgeny Donskoy
  Richard Gasquet →replaced by  Jordan Thompson
  David Goffin →replaced by  Mikhail Youzhny
  Lu Yen-hsun →replaced by  Julien Benneteau

ATP doubles main-draw entrants

Seeds

1 Rankings are as of May 29, 2017.

Other entrants
The following pairs received wildcards into the doubles main draw:
  Tallon Griekspoor /  David Pel
  Thanasi Kokkinakis /  Alexander Zverev

WTA singles main-draw entrants

Seeds

 1 Rankings are as of May 29, 2017.

Other entrants
The following players received wildcards into the main draw:
  Dominika Cibulková
  Anna Kalinskaya
  Arantxa Rus

The following players received entry from the qualifying draw:
  Andrea Hlaváčková
  Miyu Kato
  Tamara Korpatsch
  Petra Krejsová
  Cornelia Lister
  Antonia Lottner

The following player received entry as a lucky loser:
  Asia Muhammad

Withdrawals
Before the tournament
  Annika Beck →replaced by  Kirsten Flipkens
  Alizé Cornet →replaced by  Madison Brengle
  Jeļena Ostapenko →replaced by  Aliaksandra Sasnovich
  Yaroslava Shvedova →replaced by  Asia Muhammad

WTA doubles main-draw entrants

Seeds

1 Rankings are as of May 29, 2017.

Other entrants
The following pairs received wildcards into the doubles main draw:
  Richèl Hogenkamp /  Arantxa Rus
  Kelly Versteeg /  Erika Vogelsang

Champions

Men's singles

  Gilles Müller def.  Ivo Karlović, 7–6(7–5), 7–6(7–4)

Women's singles

  Anett Kontaveit def.  Natalia Vikhlyantseva, 6–2, 6–3

Men's doubles

  Łukasz Kubot /  Marcelo Melo def.  Raven Klaasen /  Rajeev Ram, 6–3, 6–4

Women's doubles

  Dominika Cibulková /  Kirsten Flipkens def.  Kiki Bertens /  Demi Schuurs, 4–6, 6–4, [10–6]

References

External links 
 

Ricoh Open
Ricoh Open
Ricoh Open
Rosmalen Grass Court Championships